Aleksandr Petrovich Gvardis (born March 2, 1965) is a retired Russian football referee. He became a FIFA international referee in 2003, and his last known activity as a referee was in 2010. He lives in Kaliningrad and is a businessman. He has refereed games in the qualification rounds for the UEFA Champions League and UEFA Cup, as well as 2010 World Cup qualifiers.

He is currently the executive director of the Russian First Division club FC Baltika Kaliningrad.

References

External links 
 
 

1965 births
Living people
Sportspeople from Kaliningrad
Russian football referees